Maurice "Mossie" Finn (1931 - 31 March 2009) was an Irish hurler who played as a right wing-forward at senior level for the Cork county team.

Born in Togher, Finn first arrived on the inter-county scene at the age of seventeen when he first linked up with the Cork minor team. He made his senior debut during the 1951 championship. Finn went on to play a brief role for Cork, and won one All-Ireland medal and one Munster medal as a non-playing substitute.

At club level Finn was a one-time championship medallist with St Finbarr's.

Finn retired from inter-county hurling following the conclusion of the 1956 championship.

Honours
St Finbarr's
Cork Senior Hurling Championship (1): 1955

Cork
All-Ireland Senior Hurling Championship (1): 1952 (sub)
Munster Senior Hurling Championship (1): 1952 (sub)

References

1931 births
2009 deaths
St Finbarr's hurlers
Cork inter-county hurlers